Hadiah Daripada Hati is the fourteenth studio album by Malaysian pop singer-songwriter Dato' Siti Nurhaliza which was released on 10 December 2007.

Background
Siti reportedly said she had been gathering new materials for her new album, which had been claimed to be a traditional album, but due to lack of materials she moved on with producing another pop album. It was also reported that Siti began her recordings since the month of Ramadan.

Siti has confirmed "Ku Mahu" as the first single. Before the release of the first single, "Hati" has been released in September 2007 as a film soundtrack of 1957: Hati Malaya. "Mulanya Cinta", third track from the album, debuted in a musical play called P. Ramlee: The Musical which was a tribute to the legendary Malay actor Tan Sri P. Ramlee. "Melawan Kesepian" is picked as the second single. And just a few weeks before the 15th Anugerah Industri Muzik, Siti choose to release her third single from the album, "Cintamu". The song won the Best Musical Arrangement In A Song, defeating her other two songs "Hati" and "Sekian Lama". The fourth which is believed to be the final single from this album is "Wanita".

Track listing
Her leading Single "Ku Mahu" has reached to its peak position, no.1, adding to her uncountable no.1 singles in Malaysia.

Awards

2008

References

2007 albums
Siti Nurhaliza albums
Albums produced by Siti Nurhaliza
Malay-language albums